Organization of Sikkimese Unity, a political organization in the Indian state of Sikkim. OSU was founded in 1994 to fight for the reinstallment of reservation quotas for the Nepali-speaking majority of the state. The general secretary of OSU is Jigme N Kazi.

References

Political parties in Sikkim
1994 establishments in Sikkim
Political parties established in 1994